Pie susu is an Indonesian custard tart pastry consisting of a shortcrust pastry filled with egg custard and condensed milk. This traditional Indonesian dessert pastry is very flat with only one very thin layer of custard. The origin of this pastry is from Bali. 

Pie susu is a unique pastry, although the shape is similar to Portuguese pastel de nata.

See also

Indonesian cuisine
Kue
List of Indonesian dishes
Pie
Melktert

References

Balinese cuisine
Indonesian desserts
Kue